Norm Black (5 November 1927 – 13 September 2011) was  a former Australian rules footballer who played with Hawthorn in the Victorian Football League (VFL).

Notes

External links 		
		
		
		
		
		
		
		
1927 births		
2011 deaths		
Australian rules footballers from Victoria (Australia)		
Hawthorn Football Club players
Kew Football Club players